Stenoptilia aktashiensis is a moth of the family Pterophoridae found in Central Asia.

References

Moths described in 1997
aktashiensis